The Skøyen–Filipstad Line is a  long railway line between Skøyen and Filipstad in Oslo, Norway.  It is used for freight trains to Oslo Port.

History 
The line was built as part of the Drammen Line that opened in 1872, as a narrow gauge  railway. It was rebuilt to standard gauge  in 1922 and at the same time electrified.  Later the line was rebuilt to double track. The line consisted of the last two kilometers of the Drammen Line that terminated at Oslo West Station (Oslo V). In 1980, the Oslo Tunnel between Skøyen and Oslo Central Station opened and Oslo V was closed. The last stretch of the Drammen Line was then transferred to a pure freight line.

References 

3 ft 6 in gauge railways in Norway
Railway lines in Norway
Railway lines in Oslo
Drammen Line
Railway lines opened in 1872
Electric railways in Norway
1872 establishments in Norway